Wans or WANS, may refer to:

 West African National Secretariat
 WANS (AM 1280), a radio station in Anderson, South Carolina, United States
 WJMZ-FM (107.3 FM), a radio station in Anderson, South Carolina, United States, formerly known as WANS-FM from 1963 until 1991.
 Jan Baptist Martin Wans (1628–1687) Flemish Baroque painter

See also

 
 
 
 Wan (disambiguation)